|}

The William Hill Handicap Hurdle is a National Hunt handicap hurdle race in England which is open to horses aged four years or older. 
It is run at Aintree over a distance of about 2 miles and 4 furlongs (4,023 metres), and it is scheduled to take place each year in April. The prize fund is £75,000.

The race was first run in 1989 and was awarded Grade 3 status in 2014.  It was re-classified as Premier Handicap for the 2023 running. It was sponsored by Oddbins from 1991 to 2002 and has had various sponsors since then.

Winners

See also
Horse racing in Great Britain
List of British National Hunt races

References

Racing Post:
 

National Hunt hurdle races
National Hunt races in Great Britain
Aintree Racecourse
Recurring sporting events established in 1989
1989 establishments in England